Bonnut is a commune in the Pyrénées-Atlantiques department in southwestern France. It is best known for the Château de Bonnut, the former residence of Henri Laborde, a general in Napoleon's army.

Inhabitants of Bonnut are called bonnutien.

See also
Communes of the Pyrénées-Atlantiques department

References

Communes of Pyrénées-Atlantiques
Pyrénées-Atlantiques communes articles needing translation from French Wikipedia